The Legends Cup is an unofficial, international friendly six-a-side football tournament that is not recognized by FIFA, for retired senior (35+) players held in Russia since 2009. A match lasts 40 minutes, 20 minutes a half. Half-time takes 10 minutes. There are 5 field players and a goalkeeper. 

The tournament is held with the support of the Russian Football Union, the Moscow City Duma and the State Duma. Russia has won the most titles with 12 to date.

Competitions

Finals 
Note: All editions held in Moscow

Wins by country

References

External links

 

2009 establishments in Russia
International association football competitions hosted by Russia
 
Recurring sporting events established in 2009
Russian football friendly trophies